Erik Haaest (14 March 1935 – 23 January 2012) was a controversial Danish journalist and author.

Haaest was born on 14 March 1935 in Hundslev on Funen to tenant Sigurd Hansen and wife Esther née Andersen and baptized Erik Hansen in Kølstrup church on 22 April 1935.

On 23 March 1953 he changed his name to Erik Haaest.

On 20 December 1962 Haaest formally left the Church of Denmark.

Haaest's father was an active member of the Danish resistance. After the war, his father refused to accept any awards from Denmark's post-war government, because many officials who had collaborated with the Germans, were still unpunished, in positions of power and were now posing as anti-Nazis. Haaest was intimately familiar with the subjects of Danish resistance, and Danish pro-Nazi collaborators.

On 18 July 2007 the newspaper Information wrote that Haaest in September 1977 had published a pamphlet asserting that the nazi concentration camp gas chambers never existed and that the Diary of Anne Frank was a forgery. This caused the Danish Arts Council to be condemned since it had funded Haaest's research into Danes who had served in the SS. Information subsequently brought a retort from Haaest where he claimed to have been deliberately misquoted and referred to the allegations as an outrageous lie made to discredit and sabotage his authorship regarding Danish pro-nazi collaborators.

References

External links
 Haaest's homepage

1935 births
2012 deaths
20th-century Danish journalists
20th-century Danish writers
20th-century Danish male writers
Holocaust deniers